Rugby World is a monthly rugby union magazine running since October 1960. It is published monthly by Future plc and edited by Owain Jones who took over from long-standing editor Paul Morgan in January 2012. Paul Morgan was long considered a leader in the industry, the magazine is the world's top-selling rugby magazine and has benefited from a worldwide rise in interest in rugby following the 2003 Rugby Union World Cup.

The magazine was initially published on "the third Wednesday of every month" by Longacre Press Limited (part of Odhams Press) which, in 1961, merged with Fleetway Publications and again in 1963 Fleetway merged with a number of other publishers to form IPC Media, though Odhams remained a distinct sub-company until 1968). The magazine was available through INI Sales and Distribution, 161-166 Fleet Street, London E.C.4.  The original cost of the magazine was 2 Shillings (equivalent to £ today). By the end of 1962 it was retailing at 2 Shillings 6 pence (written "2/6d", £ today) and currently retails for £4.30 per issue, though various other deals are available by buying subscriptions and / or the electronic version of the magazine.

Today, Rugby World is published by Future plc.

Alan Dymock took over from Sarah Mockford as Rugby World Editor on November 21st 2022.

See also
 Bill McLaren
 Norman Mair
 Ian Robertson (rugby commentator)
 Nigel Starmer-Smith

References

External links
 Rugby World website
 Samoan Rugby World website

Sports magazines published in the United Kingdom
Magazines established in 1960
Rugby football magazines
Rugby union mass media
Rugby union in the United Kingdom
Odhams Press magazines